Xeranthemum annuum is a flowering plant species also known as annual everlasting or immortelle. It is native to eastern Europe and western Asia, is cultivated as a garden flower. It has become naturalised in other parts of Europe.

The immortelle is a symbol of eternity and immortality. It is an annual plant of dry, sunny lawns, slopes, vines, loess farms and karst bushes. pecies. The leaves are typically elongated, spear-like with a silvery-gray color, and the leaves are downy. Immortelles bloom during the summer months, from June to September, when the populations are a delightful pink-lilac flower field.

Immortelle is easy to hold because it feels comfortable in dry, sunny conditions.

References

annuum
Garden plants of Europe
Garden plants of Asia